The Cavaliers was an unofficial New Zealand rugby union team which toured South Africa in 1986. Because of the Apartheid policies of the South African government, the official New Zealand Rugby Union tour scheduled for 1985 was cancelled, and the Cavaliers tour was very controversial in New Zealand.

They played twelve matches, including a four-match test series against South Africa, which they lost 3—1.

History

After the intensely controversial 1981 South African tour of New Zealand, which had provoked nationwide protest and worldwide condemnation, the official All Black tour planned for 1985 was cancelled due to a legal ruling that it would be incompatible with the NZRFU's legally stated purpose: "...the fostering and encouragement of the game of rugby..."

Of the 30 players who had been selected for the 1985 tour, only David Kirk and John Kirwan did not join the Cavaliers. The rebel team were widely believed to have received large secret payments—a controversial issue at a time when rugby union was still supposedly an amateur sport.

The Cavaliers were coached by Colin Meads, managed by Ian Kirkpatrick and captained by Andy Dalton and won just one of the four matches against South Africa, although they won seven of their eight other games on the tour. Dalton suffered a broken jaw in the second match of the tour against Northern Transvaal and played no more rugby that season, Jock Hobbs assumed the captaincy for the test matches against the Springboks while Andy Haden did the same for the midweek matches.

The tour was widely condemned for touring apartheid South Africa, and very controversial within New Zealand, and there were no future rugby contacts until the South African apartheid regime ended. The  return test that marked the return of South Africa to official international Rugby Union in 1992 would again be held against a New Zealand side, this time the official All Blacks.

The players found that support for their actions was far less than they had expected. On their return, the NZRFU barred all the players from participating in the next two All Black tests, and instead selected a new group of players. Most of these replacement players were younger, and were quickly dubbed the "Baby Blacks". Those new All Blacks went on to form the basis of one of the most successful periods in All Black rugby, which resulted in a few Cavalier players struggling to get their places back.

It is, however, debatable to what extent the tour had a significant effect on the international careers of many of the players. The squad included players in the prime of their career, players approaching retirement anyway who had not recently played for New Zealand, and uncapped prospects, and as such, subsequent All Black appearances or a lack of these reflected this fact. 10 members of the Cavaliers (Fox, Taylor, Green, Crowley, Buck Shelford, both Whetton brothers, Anderson, Pierce, and McDowell) all subsequently played for the New Zealand side that won the inaugural Rugby World Cup in 1987, and Dalton was named in the squad for the World Cup, but withdrew following injury, and retired. 
Another 7 players (Osbourne, Clamp, Fraser, Deans, Donald, Crichton, and Frank Shelford) never played again for New Zealand, but their international careers were effectively over long before the tour had even begun, having not played for New Zealand for between 2 and 5 years beforehand. 
John Mills had never been capped at test level before the tour, and retired from both domestic and international rugby at the end of the season anyway, while Dave Loveridge and Jock Hobbs, both of whom had previously been capped internationally, similarly retired from all rugby at the end of the 1986 season owing to a knee injury and a series of concussions respectively.

Not being able to play in the official jersey, the team wore a black uniform, with bands of gold in honour of the tour sponsor, the South African Yellow Pages, who also covered the stay expenses for the team. The emblem consisted of a gold background with a green oval in which an upright silver fern accompanied by a Springbok appeared.

Management 

 Colin Meads (King Country) (coach)
 Ian Kirkpatrick (Poverty Bay) (manager)

Backs 

 Robbie Deans (Canterbury)
 Kieran Crowley (Taranaki)
 Bernie Fraser (Wellington)
 Mike Clamp (Wellington)
 Craig Green (Canterbury)
 Bill Osborne (Wanganui)
 Steven Pokere (Auckland)
 Bryce Robins (Taranaki)
 Victor Simpson (Canterbury)
 Warwick Taylor (Canterbury)
 Wayne Smith (Canterbury)
 Grant Fox (Auckland)
 Dave Loveridge (Taranaki)
 Andrew Donald (Wanganui)

Forwards 

 Murray Mexted (Wellington)
 Buck Shelford (North Harbour)
 Jock Hobbs (Canterbury)
 Mark Shaw (Hawke's Bay)
 Frank Shelford (Bay of Plenty)
 Alan Whetton (Auckland)
 Andy Haden (Auckland)
 Albert Anderson (Canterbury)
 Gary Whetton (Auckland)
 Murray Pierce (Wellington)
 John Ashworth (Hawke's Bay)
 Gary Knight (Manawatu)
 Steve McDowall (Auckland)
 Scott Crichton (Wellington)
 Andy Dalton (Counties) (Captain)
 John Mills (Canterbury)
 Hika Reid (Bay of Plenty)

Matches 

Scores and results list New Zealand's points tally first.

See also

 1981 South Africa rugby union tour of New Zealand
 Sporting boycott of South Africa during the apartheid era
 South Africa under apartheid

References 

New Zealand and the Commonwealth of Nations
South Africa and the Commonwealth of Nations
New Zealand rugby union teams
1986
New Zealand Cavaliers
Events associated with apartheid
1986 in South African rugby union
cavaliers
Rugby union and apartheid
Sports scandals in New Zealand